Saltillo is one of the 38 municipalities of Coahuila, in north-eastern Mexico. The municipal seat lies at Saltillo. The municipality covers an area of 6837 km².

As of 2005, the municipality had a total population of 648,929. 

The municipal government is headed by the municipal president of Saltillo (or mayor of Saltillo).

References

Municipalities of Coahuila